Mina Mojtahedi (born  in Tehran, Iran) is a Finnish wheelchair curler.

She participated in the 2014 Winter Paralympics where Finnish team finished on tenth place.

In 2018–2020 she lived in Switzerland and competed in 2019 and 2020 Swiss Wheelchair Curling Championship.

She was born in Iran, her father are Iranian and mother are Finnish. They moved from Iran to Scotland when Mina was at the age of 6.

Teams

References

External links 

Profile at the official website for the 2014 Winter Paralympics

Living people
1973 births
Sportspeople from Tehran
Finnish female curlers
Finnish wheelchair curlers
Paralympic wheelchair curlers of Finland
Wheelchair curlers at the 2014 Winter Paralympics
Finnish expatriates in Scotland
Finnish people of Iranian descent